The 1942 Auckland Rugby League season was its 34th. The season was extremely hampered by World War II with so many men away at war. The Auckland Rugby League reduced the number of teams in the senior grade from 9 to 6, and there were few reserve grade matches and no senior B competition what so ever. Many clubs were forced to focus on their junior teams and schoolboy sides.

The Fox Memorial Shield was won by Manukau for the second time in its history following its first title in 1936. They finished with a 13 win, 2 loss record, comfortably ahead of the amalgamated City-Otahuhu side in second place with a 10 win, 5 loss record. The City-Otahuhu side had won all 5 of their first round matches to win the Rukutai Shield. The Roope Rooster was won by Richmond Rovers who beat the amalgamated Marist-North Shore side 13-6 in the final. This was the 7th time Richmond had won the Roope Rooster trophy. A week later the Stormont Shield was won by Manukau who defeated Richmond 11 to 5.

The J. F. W. Dickson medal for a senior player went to Owen Hughes of the City-Otahuhu club who was adjudged the most sportsmanlike player in the code for the season, while the junior medal was awarded to Arnold Jones of the Glenora club. They were presented at the board meeting on September 23. The following week the veteran player Lindsay Simons of the North Shore club was also presented with a medal.

There were only three representative matches played. On July 11 Auckland hosted South Auckland (northern Waikato) at Carlaw Park and won 49 to 16. Then on August 29 Auckland Māori (Tamaki) beat Auckland Pākēha 10 points to 8. The same two teams met again on September 28, this time a 23-all draw was the result. The year was also marked by the deaths of several players while at war.

Auckland Rugby League News

ARL Chairman nomination
On March 6 the trustees of Carlaw Park announced that Mr. J. W. Watson, J.P., had been nominated for the chairmanship of the Auckland Rugby League control board to succeed Mr. G. Grey Campbell, who was not available for re-election due to “business and health reasons and was retiring from the position after nine years. Watson was the manager and director of Heards Limited and had been a “keen supporter of rugby league for many years”. He had been “actively associated with the Manukau club and of late years has been a member of the New Zealand Rugby League Council, representing Wellington [Rugby] League”. Mr. Grey Campbell was nominated by Mr. John A. Lee to succeed him as president as he was retiring from the position.

Annual report
On March 23 the Auckland Rugby League released its annual report. It showed that despite the “overshadowing effect of the war, it was able at the end of the season to show a profit of £309”. There had been a “consensus of opinion of the leaders of governments and military authorities... that recreational sport such as football should be carried on”. It was said that the “war made serious inroads among the players, while in other directions rugby league played its part in the war effort in New Zealand. Since the commencement of the war Carlaw Park has, without cost, been placed at the disposal of many essential units engaged in war activities”. The accounts showed that the main source of revenue, which was from gate receipts had dropped from £4486 in 1940 to £3923 in 1941 which was a drop of £563. However the working account only showed a reduction of £271. In terms of referees it was noted that over 10 percent of referees had enlisted, and many others were engaged in war production work and therefore unable to work on Saturday’s. This had meant that on many occasions some members had had to referee two or three matches on a single day.

Annual meeting
The 32nd annual meeting was scheduled for March 25 at the Auckland Rugby League rooms in the Grey Buildings in Courthouse Lane on Wednesday at 7.45pm. President John A. Lee spoke at the meeting and said that it was “apparent that the war had made inroads, not only into the administration of the game, but also to the clubs, which had lost the services of many good players. “You have a duty to perform in carrying on the game and in providing competition for all who remain”. He also paid tribute to the retiring chairman Mr. G. Grey Campbell. Campbell said that “he had spent nine happy years as chairman and he was now handing over the reins of office at a difficult time. However, he was assured of the assistance of a very loyal crew of officials. He thanked Messrs. I. Culpan (secretary) and J. E. Knowling (treasurer) for their loyal support. Mr. J. W. Watson was welcomed as the newly appointed chairman. The following officials were elected: Patron, Mr. J. B. Donald; president, Mr. G. Grey Campbell; vice-patrons, Messrs. J. F. W. Dickson, J. A. Lee, M.P.; chairman, Mr. J. W. Watson; deputy-chairman, Mr. E. J. Phelan; auditors, Messrs. Garrard and Bennett; hon. solicitor, Mr. H. M. Rogerson; secretary, Mr. I Culpan; treasurer, Mr. Mr J. E. Knowling, Mr. R. Doble; management committee, Messrs. J. W. Probert, E. Chapman, Jim Clark, V. Rose, T. Wilson. T. Davis, William Mincham, and R. Doble.

On April 16 a “Presentation Social Night” was held to honour the retired chairman, Mr. G. Grey Campbell at Lewis Eady Hall on Queen Street. Chairman Mr. J. W. Watson presided over the evening and the main presentation of a silver tea service was given by Mr. E. J. Phelan, the deputy chairman. Phelan “related many instances of the business sagacity of” Campbell, “who had put into the management of the code all his powers ad talents”. During the evening other presentations were made to Campbell, including the Junior Board (secretary’s satchel), schoolboys (dinner service), ladies (barometer), referees (clock), and senior clubs (two fireside chairs). The chairman of the Auckland Rugby Union, Mr. A. A. Baker said “I would like to pay a high tribute to the sportsmanship of Mr. Campbell... it had been a pleasure to have worked with him in the interests of sport generally”., while Mr. F. Baker, chairman of the Auckland Football Association, said his “common sense had made for harmonious relations among the winter sportsmen”. Campbell in his reply thanks Ivan Culpan, and Mr. J. E. Rowling for their help and also his wife for her support.

Senior competition amalgamations and protest
At the April 8 meeting of the board of control it was announced that nine teams had been nominated for the senior grade competition however a decision was not made immediately as to whether all the teams would be accepted without learning more about their relative strength first. Mr. R. Doble said that it was originally intended to limit the senior championship to seven clubs, with a preference for six well-balanced teams. It was decided to defer the draw until the following Wednesday (April 15).

A deputation from an army unit regarding the entry of a team in the senior grade was heard. They said that a number of prominent players would be available each Saturday, but several of them were registered with local clubs. Chairman Watson said transfers to the Army team from local clubs would not be favourably considered.

At the April 15 board meeting it was decided to omit the Manukau club from the senior grade, and also not accept the nomination from a military team from the motor transport pool. The Motor Transport Pool team later decided to enter a team to play rugby union. They would ultimately win the Gallaher Shield (the ARU senior club rugby competition) later in the year. Otahuhu Rovers however did have their nomination accepted as they had sent in a list of 25 players, most of whom were engaged in essential trades. Mr. William Mincham expressed disappointment at the “laxity of the clubs in submitting the personnel of teams. He said every support had been given to club secretaries but it was apparent that the full strength of clubs was not known”. The board would look at the teams on the field in a preliminary round on April 18 to see their strength and then decide on the final sides to begin the championship proper.

Following the preliminary games on April 18 the ARL control board met in the evening and decided to merge several senior sides “so that the identity of the clubs will not be lost during wartime competition”. The clubs who would merge were North Shore and Marist, Newton and Mount Albert, City and Otahuhu, while Manukau, Richmond, and Ponsonby would remain as stand alone senior sides. It was remarked that the Mount Albert club did not approve of joining up with the Newton club. In fact prior to their first combined match the Mount Albert club published a notice in the Auckland Star that stated “patrons and members of the Mt. Albert Rugby League Club kindly note that the Mt Albert-Newton team is in no way connected with the well-known Mt Albert Rugby League Football Club which plays under the blue and gold colours”.

Prior to the start of the season the Otahuhu club received a letter from the military authorities that said “we cannot let men off for sport if it is not their weekend free. It would not be fair to my officers and men if special leave were granted for football”. The Auckland Rugby League considered the letter at their weekly meeting on April 30 and they had two other similar letters from the camps at Papakura and Avondale.

The second week of preliminary matches was something of a mess when neither the North Shore nor Mount Albert clubs contributed any players to their amalgamated sides leaving Newton and Marist to play as themselves. While in the City-Otahuhu combined side both clubs fielded their own team for a half each. Following the weekend the ARL board met to review the amalgamation scheme. Chairman Watson said “he had met members of the two clubs concerned, and thought that the prospect of the dissenting clubs (North Shore and Mount Albert) as at present constituted, coming into the scheme most remote”. Mr. E. J. Phelan “urged that cooperation was desired”. On May 13 the ARL received a letter from the Mount Albert club asking them to reconsider the amalgamation scheme. The board decided to replay that the decision could not be changed. It was decided to run the senior competition for three rounds with the board holding the right to curtail the season if it was necessary.

In June after the 6th round of matches North Shore Albions called a special meeting and eventually decided to confirm their amalgamation. Until that time none of their players had taken part in any matches played by the side. Negotiations were carried out by Messrs. Joe Sayegh (president), and Jack Kirwan (secretary) who represented the Marist club, while Messrs. Horace H. Hunt, and J. Mann represented the North Shore club. It was then reported that six North Shore players would be available for the following Saturday. Chairman of the ARL, Mr. Watson said that the North Shore club had agreed to the scheme for the duration of the war.

Availability of senior players in military camps
Despite requests early in the season for senior league players to be made available for Saturday games the league was repeatedly told that this would not be possible. Then during the season the Otahuhu club requested leave for one of their players but the commanding officer of the camp said "I regret I am unable to allow any men extra leave for sport other than for Rugby Union and hockey teams on Saturdays". Upon seeing the letter at the board meeting on June 24 chairman Mr. J. W. Watson, "thought the time had arrived when strong action should be taken on this question of the feeling in some military quarters against the league code. He realised that any complaint might be visited upon the player concerned, but action should be taken in view of the Minister of Defence, Mr. Fred Jones, that no bias would be shown towards league players and that leave would be granted to them equally with any other game of football". Members spoke strongly on the issue and it was decided to communicate directly with the Minister of Defence immediately.

Refusal for league team to travel
In August a trip to Wellington by the Manukau league side to play a Wellington was not allowed by the railway authorities, however one by a rugby union team was allowed. Chairman Watson “went on to detail efforts made in trying to overcome this alleged affront to rugby league. He had interviewed railway officials at Auckland who admitted that permission had been granted for an Auckland Rugby Union team to go to Wellington for a football match, while a similar application for a league team had been refused. They said they could not give any reason for this discrimination, and were instructed by Wellington not to give any reason”. Chairman Watson “concluded that protests had been forwarded to prominent members of Parliament and of the War Cabinet”. A week later a telegram was received at the meeting of the board of control on September 2 from the Minister of Railways, Mr. Bob Semple, “stating that permission had been granted for the Māori league team [Manukau] to visit Wellington on September 12 for the purpose of playing a match on [the] Basin Reserve”. Chairman Watson said that “the question of the application had been placed before the acting Prime Minister, the Hon. Daniel Giles Sullivan, and all connected with the code would be pleased with the amended decision”.

Richmond v M.T.P. proposed match
On October 6 it was reported that Chairman Watson had stated that “at the request of Military Transport Pool (winner of the Gallagher Shield, Auckland rugby’s chief club trophy) a match has been arranged for next Saturday at Carlaw Park against Richmond (holder of the Roope Rooster)”. The gate was said to be divided between the M.T.P. regimental fund, the St. John Ambulance and the Auckland Rugby League. The match would be clashing with the rugby match between Auckland and the Third New Zealand Division military side. The ARL even began to advertise the match in the newspapers despite no assurances from the ARU that the match would be permitted on their part. The president of the M.T.P. Rugby Football Club, Captain J. Todd was surprised by the advertisements and “he declared that the match had been definitely cancelled last Monday. You can take it from me that the M.T.P. team cannot play”. He went on to say “owing to unforeseen circumstances he had considered that it was not possible for his club team to take part in the match. For that reason he had communicated to the chairman of the Auckland Rugby League last Monday the fact that the M.T.P. team would not be available this Saturday. The following day it was reported that “as far as the league is concerned the match between M.T.P. and Richmond is definitely on, not withstanding Captain Todd’s statement, said Chairman Watson. He went on to say “I would like to point out that M.T.P. men are rugby league players. “We know” added Mr Watson that the team is still anxious to play this game”. Five of the M.T.P. team had been selected for the Auckland representative side in their match. Watson said “it is important to bear in mind that this is an Auckland Rugby Union representative team and not a military team. We know of no authority that any military officer has empowering him to determine the code of football soldiers under his command should play when away from military duties... as members of the M.T.P. team have been available to play rugby union football every Saturday of the past season we can only presume that there should be no military duties to interfere with the personnel of the team playing the game they desire on any one particular Saturday”. On October 7 at the ARL board meeting it was decided that the match would most likely be cancelled and that a final decision would made on the 8th. It was announced later in the afternoon that the match would no longer be able to proceed.

Just days later a match was advertised to be played at Western Springs between a side named “All Golds” and Auckland Māori. The side listed for the All Golds featured a large number of rugby league players who had spent the season in the M.T.P. side so it appears to be an effort on their part to arrange their own match. The match was being provided by the NZ RL Old Boys’ Association which had been established a year prior. The Auckland Rugby League stated in an advertisement that the match was not under their jurisdiction, “nor has it our authority”.

Reserve grade competition
Due to the low numbers of senior players the competition did not begin and a decision on it running at all was deferred until following the 2nd round of senior matches. Ultimately there was no proper reserve grade competition though some reserve grade sides played matches during the season.

Carlaw Park
Carlaw Park continued, as it had done in previous years to be used by the military for training purposes. It was used on January 18 by the Auckland City Battalion for an all day parade. During the offseason the lease of the ground had been secured for a further 21 years. At the board of control meeting on April 8 it was stated that “satisfactory arrangements were being made for the erection of suitable dispersal gates for the speedy release of patrons at Carlaw Park in the event of an emergency”. It was decided to make entry for Carlaw Park matches sixpence for soldiers and visiting men of Allied nations. Returned soldiers would be admitted for free. The ordinary entry fee was 1 shilling for the ground, sixpence for ladies and sixpence for the grandstand. At the May 27 board meeting the room rearrangement underneath the Carlaw Park grandstand was discussed as the board had given 3 of them to the E.P.S. fire service. At the board meeting on July 29 Mr. W. Foreshaw was presented with a wallet and a cheque to thank him for being in charge of the players’ gate at Carlaw Park for 21 years as a volunteer. Chairman Watson said “the great success of the code had been due to the services rendered by men of the stamp of Foreshaw”.

War effort contributions
At the board meeting on May 27 Mr. J. W. Probert said that “the time has arrived for the people to do all they can for the Liberty Loan”. He said “that though the league had given the Home Guard the use of Carlaw Park and the Fire Section of the E.P.S. the free use of rooms under the grandstand, the league could still do more in this time of national stress. The need was urgent and he proposed that the board take up £100 in the loan”. Chairman Mr. J. W. Watson “was in full agreement with the proposal, to which the board agreed”. Days later the Reserve Bank recorded that it had received £100 for the Liberty Loan from the Auckland Rugby League.

Old timers’ passes
It was decided on April 22 that former senior players would be given senior match passes for the season based on how many senior games they had played. For 50 matches they would receive a one season pass; 60, two seasons; 70, three seasons; and so on up to 100 games with a limit of a six years’ pass to any player.

Life membership
A subcommittee met at the board meeting on June 11 to discuss the criteria for life membership. The committee was chaired by Mr. G Grey Campbell (the retired board chairman). Their recommendations “included that the honour, character and standing of the recipient must be taken into account; that the League should have the right of recalling the honour if the recipient brought dishonour upon the code, and that life membership only be granted on a four-fifths majority of the board”. The recommendations of the subcommittee were all approved.

Thomas (Scotty) McClymont
On April 1 Thomas McClymont was nominated by the Richmond Rovers club for life membership of Auckland Rugby League and it was agreed to. He had played 100 matches for the Ponsonby United seniors from 1913 to 1924, along with 17 appearances for Auckland (1919-22), and 16 for New Zealand (1919-24). He had also coached Richmond Rovers for several seasons in the mid 1930s as well as coaching Auckland and New Zealand. In 2007 he was inducted into the New Zealand Legend of League. Messrs R. Doble and T. Davis supported the recommendation and “both drew attention to the long and faithful service Mr. McClymont had given to the code, “As a selector, player, and advisor”, said Mr. Doble, “he has proved an outstanding personality in the code”.

Mr. George Chapman
On May 6 life membership was granted to Mr. George Chapman of Ellerslie in recognition of 30 years service to the code. His nomination was by the junior control board.

Auckland representative side
At the May 13 board of control meeting Mr. A. J. (Dougie) McGregor, Bill Cloke, and Stan Prentice were appointed Auckland selectors for the season. All three were past Auckland club, representative, and New Zealand team players.

Obituaries

Laurence Douglas Mills
It was reported in mid January that Private Laurence Douglas Mills had been killed in the Western Desert campaign of North Africa on December 1, 1941. Mills was the son of Ephraim and Irene Winifrede Mills of Grey Lynn. He had been a Richmond schoolboy player and moved through the various grades until debuting for the senior side in 1938. He played for Richmond seniors from 1938 to 1940, scoring 26 tries. He also represented Auckland Pākehā in 1940, and was selected for the aborted New Zealand tour of England and Wales in 1939 at the age of just 20. He had been educated at Mount Albert Grammar School and departed with the Third Echelon. His only brother, Ray, had departed with an earlier draft. He was memorialised at El Alamein War Cemetery in Egypt.

Malcolm Vernon Cato
In early August it was reported that Malcolm (Mal) Vernon Cato had been killed in an aircraft accident while serving on July 16. He was 25 years of age at the time of his death. Cato had been “educated at the Te Kaha School, where his father was native schoolmaster, and then at Mount Albert Grammar School." He belonged to the North Shore Rugby Club and also played senior rugby league for Mount Albert after joining them in late 1939 and playing the 1940 season and the early part of 1941 before his departure overseas. Cato was "a keen student of the Māori language... and very popular among Māoris in the Te Kaha district. When news of his death was received, a tangi was held in his memory". The Mount Albert senior players wore armbands as a mark of respect for their match on August 1 with Ponsonby. The Mount Albert senior players wore armbands as a mark of respect for their match on August 1 with Ponsonby. At the board meeting on August 5 a “motion of sympathy was carried in silence with” his relatives. Cato was buried at Beck Row (St John’s) Churchyard, Mildenhall, Suffolk, England.

Fox Memorial Shield (senior grade championship)

Preliminary rounds
After the first round the Auckland Rugby League looked to enforce their amalgamation decision however both North Shore and Mount Albert refused to join with Marist and Newton respectively therefore those sides played as themselves. City and Otahuhu did play 'together' however they played one half each in their match with Ponsonby. There was no scoring provided for any of the matches aside from a mention that B Sullings scored a try in Richmond's round 1 win over Ponsonby, and E Cowley scored 2 tries in Newtons round 2 win over Marist. Later in the season it was also mentioned that Tom Chase had scored 102 points to that point in the season and as he had only scored 92 points in the Fox Memorial matches it is implied that he kicked 5 goals in the preliminary matches. The first round saw a number of players on weekend leave.

Fox Memorial standings
{|
|-
|

Fox Memorial results

Round 1
In the match between Ponsonby and Newton-Mt Albert the referee, H. Tate was injured after becoming “involved in a forward struggle during the last few minutes and injured his leg”. He had to be taken to Auckland Hospital.

Round 2
Two players were ordered off in the Ponsonby v Richmond match. The judicial committee decided to issue “a warning against any rough play” in future matches.

Round 3
Mount Albert decided that and their players would bury “the hatchet and threw in their lot to amalgamate with Newton”. It was reported that “between the two teams a good all-round thirteen is possible”. They defeated the Marist-North Shore side 13 points to 2. Though as North Shore had still not decided to contribute players to the opposition side their win was effectively over Marist.

Round 4
The Marist-North Shore win over Ponsonby was technically the 200th win in North Shore Albions history in first grade competition however as they had still not agreed to officially contribute players to the amalgamated side it is debatable that it should count as the 200th. By the 7th round they were contributing players and in the 9th round they did secure a 15-5 win over Ponsonby. Alf Broadhead was ordered off for Richmond in their match with City-Otahuhu. The evidence of the incident was heard in committee and it was decided to take no action against him. Afterwards Chairman Watson spoke generally, appealing “to all players to support the referees in their difficult task”. The issue had arisen due to the “habit of senior players disputing referees’ decisions, with William Mincham, the delegate to the Referees Association saying it “was becoming a common complaint and he endorsed the remarks of the chairman”. Claude List made his season debut for the combined Newton-Mount Albert side aged 40.

Round 5
Manukau fielded a very large forward pack, even with Steve Watene absent they at times placed just five men in the scrum giving them an extra man in the backs.

Round 6
It was decided at the end of the first round with City-Otahuhu undefeated and with Manukau with one loss (in round 1 to City-Otahuhu) that their match would act as a semi-final for the senior championship. If City-Otahuhu won they would win the competition, however it was decided after their loss that the competition would continue for its full duration of 3 rounds. Prior to the start of the games Chairman J. W. Watson “extended a welcome to members and nurses of overseas forces and the Manukau team gave a spirited haka”. Referee S. Billman refereed his 100th match involving first grade club teams although it is unlikely the league was aware of this fact as record keeping was relatively poor at the time. He became just the third referee to achieve the feat after Les Bull and Percy Rogers.

Round 7
Round 7 was the first time that North Shore had made an official contribution of players to the amalgamated side with Marist. A meeting between representatives of the two clubs during the week had resulted in North Shore decide to contribute 6 players to the side for Saturday. They were Rutherford, Hunt, Fields, Simons (though he had previously played), Meredith, and Penman.

Round 8
After the matches the Auckland Star wrote a small piece on the leading point scorers for the competition to date. Niwa, who had moved north from New Plymouth where he had been playing rugby had moved into 3rd position (38 points) after kicking 5 goals in Newton-Mt Albert’s latest match. Tom Chase was second with 53 points and Alan Donovan first with 56 points.

Round 9

Round 10
It was decided that at the end of the second round of games “it was proposed to adhere to a decision to play a third round in the senior championship”. A “Victory Trophy, a gift of war bonds” (£10) would go to the team with the most competition points in the matches remaining. H Emus and Richard Shadbolt both made their first appearances of the season for the Newton-Mt Albert side. The matches were played in heavy rain. Ponsonby scored an upset win over Manukau after greatly reinforcing their side. Jordan who had come over from Northcote & Birkenhead Ramblers 2 years earlier turned out, along with Arthur Kay, Herkt, Marsh (a 17 stone ex Manukau player), Roy Nurse, and Hughes. C Day was on his debut as a 1st grade referee in the Ponsonby v Manukau match.

Round 11
Merv Devine made his first appearance of the season for Richmond. He had joined them in 1938 after previously having represented Wairarapa, Manawatu, and Wellington in rugby union. Jack Hemi likewise made his first appearance of the season for Manukau in the five eighth position. In the City-Otahuhu match against Newton-Mt Albert the 3 Johnson brothers were all absent along with Hawea Mataira and Finlayson however they still managed to win anyway. On the Newton-Mt Albert side Tredea made his first appearance of the season. He had been trained as a pilot officer but was hoping to be available to play some more matches.

Round 12
The Mt Albert players wore armbands to respect their teammate Malcolm (Mal) Cato who had been killed in action. Quirke (Newton-Mt Albert), and Marsh (Ponsonby) were both sent off in their match with each other. The judicial committee subsequently suspended both players for “four club playing Saturdays for misconduct on the field”. Both clubs appealed the decision a week later and the issue was taken in committee. Chairman Watson “stated afterwards that the penalty had been altered from four playing club days to four playing Saturdays”. Tom Chase brought his season points tally to 102 after kicking 5 goals in Manukau’s win over City-Otahuhu. Referee R. Rowland was on debut in the Marist-North Shore match.

Round 13
With Manukau’s 19-3 win over Richmond they had secured their second ever Fox Memorial title after their first in 1936. Their win had put them 6 points clear of their nearest rival (City-Otahuhu) with just 2 rounds remaining. Richard (Dick) R. Hull made his debut for Ponsonby. He was an ex-Wellington and North Island (1936) representative rugby player.

Round 14
Ordinarily when the 1st grade title had been decided the ARL would make the decision to conclude the competition and move into the Roope Rooster knockout competition however with the Victory Trophy (war bonds) being awarded to the team with the best record in the final round it was decided to continue the full season of 3 rounds and 15 matches for each team. City Rovers, playing as half of the amalgamated side with Otahuhu registered their 200th 1st grade competition win in their 385th match.

Round 15
Manukau won the Victory Trophy (war bonds) with their defeat of Ponsonby. Both teams were undefeated in the final round with 4 wins each, and their match with each other effectively decided the trophy. For much of the game the score was close with the scores tied 2-2 after 60 minutes before Manukau put on 26 points to win comfortably 28-2. Ponsonby’s forwards included P. McKenzie (Wellington), and K. Ward (Hawke’s Bay), both former rugby players with McKenzie having played for Wellington B. The New Zealand Herald remarked that “the speed and splendid handling of both backs and forwards stamped Manukau as a brilliant combination which compares favourably with the best seen at Carlaw Park since it was opened in 1921.

Roope Rooster

Round 1
It was decided after the first round matches that the Phelan Shield would not be competed for this year. It was traditionally played for as a knockout trophy between teams who had been eliminated in the first round of the Roope Rooster competition. Manukau were upset in round 1 which made the Roope Rooster draw easier to complete as they had made arrangements to travel to Wellington to play the local representative side the following weekend.

Semi finals

Final
Richmond’s 13-6 win over the combined Marist-North Shore side was their 7th Roope Rooster title.

Stormont Shield
Manukau’s 11-5 win saw them win the Stormont Shield for the second consecutive year after the 1941 win, which was the first in their history. V. A. Ensor a Waikato rugby player turned out for Richmond, while J Inglis, a former Wairarapa rugby player debuted for Manukau and scored a try.

Top try scorers and point scorers

Other Club Matches and Lower Grades

Manukau match in Wellington
On September 12 Manukau played against Wellington at the Basin Reserve in Wellington. The team was managed by Mr. H. De Wolfe. Jack Hemi apparently impressed the crowd when "right at the start he landed his kick off between the posts". He went on to score 14 points from 2 tries, 3 conversions and a penalty.

Lower grade sides including schools
There was almost no coverage whatsoever of the junior grades in 1942. With the war dominating so much of the media's attention there were no match fixtures published and no results published either aside from some Papakura results which appeared in the Franklin Times.
Grades were made of the following teams with the strong possibility of additional unknown teams:
Third Grade: Ellerslie United, Glenora, Green Lane, City Rovers
Fourth Grade: Ellerslie United, City Rovers, Mount Albert United, Ponsonby United
Fifth Grade: 
Sixth Grade: Ellerslie United, Ponsonby United, Richmond Rovers, Mount Albert
Seventh Grade: Ellerslie United. Marist Old Boys, Ponsonby United, Point Chevalier. Point Chevalier won the championship with a 12 win no loss record, scoring 319 points, against just 2. Des White played for them.
Schoolboys
Senior (Lou Rout trophy): Glenora, Green Lane, Mount Albert, Newton, Papakura, Point Chevalier, and Ponsonby
Intermediate: (Newport and Eccles Memorial Shield): Green Lane, Marist, Mount Albert, Papakura, Point Chevalier, and Richmond
Junior: Green Lane, Marist, Mount Albert, Northcote, Panmure, and Papakura
Seven-a-side: Otahuhu, Marist, Mount Albert, and Green Lane

Auckland Primary Schools v South Auckland Primary Schools
On July 11 an Auckland Primary Schools representative side took on the South Auckland (northern Waikato) primary schools side.

On October 31 the Auckland Rugby League Schoolboys Gala took place at Carlaw Park. A match was played between an A and B team with the A team winning 8 points to 3. The Otahuhu Workshops Band provided music during the day. Running races were held during the event along with a goal kicking competition which was won by Pitcher of Pt Chevalier (Senior), Roy Moore of Green Lane (Intermediate), and Scudder of Panmure (Junior). Other events included a tug-of-war, and relays. Roy Moore would later play for New Zealand from 1952 to 56.

Representative season
The Auckland team was selected by A. J. McGregor, Bill Cloke, and Stan Prentice, and was managed by James (Jim) Clark.

On August 22 Auckland named a junior representative team to play against a South Auckland (northern Waikato) representative side. It was: Lake, and F Johnstone (Mt Albert), Jones, W Smith, and Dracevitch (Glenora), Jack Osborne, Fielder, Harkness, and Nugent (Green Lane), Price, B Simpson, and Granich (Ellerslie), Ryan, and Barnes (Pt Chevalier), and Godfrey, and Redfern (Avondale).

Auckland v South Auckland (north Waikato)
The crowd for the match was described as the largest of the season to that point. In addition to the 13 who played for Auckland the following players were named reserves: W Kinney (Richmond), M McWilliams (Marist), Pita Ririnui (Manukau), and W Findlater (City). Future New Zealand international Ron McGregor was on representative debut aged just 18. Hawea Mataira was initially named in the Auckland starting side but was unable to play and Pita Ririnui took his place. Tom Chase captained the Auckland team.

Auckland Māori (Tāmaki) v Auckland Pākehā
The now annual match between Auckland Māori and Auckland Pākēha was played at Carlaw Park on August 29. The proceeds went to the injured player fund.

Auckland Māori (Tāmaki) v Auckland Pākehā
The return match was played on September 28 and saw a high-scoring draw. A curtain-raiser was played between Green Lane and Glenora and saw a player, Colin Campbell concussed and taken to Auckland Hospital. A day after his condition was described as "fair".

Unofficial representative match (All Golds v Māori)
On October 17 a team named the All Golds played against a Māori side. The All Golds team was essentially the M.T.P (Military Transport Pool) side which won the Gallaher Shield. Efforts had been made for the M.T.P. side to play Richmond a week prior but the Auckland Rugby Union said the match would not be possible and it was ultimately cancelled. As the team was made up almost entirely of rugby league players (with several Kiwi’s) they formed an unofficial team to play a Māori side. The Māori team was made up largely of the Auckland Māori side. The match was played at Western Springs and as it was not being played under the auspices of the Auckland Rugby League a makeshift referee was needed, which turned out to be Arthur Kay.

Auckland representative matches played and scorers

Auckland Māori representative matches played and scorers

Auckland Pākēha representative matches played and scorers

Annual General Meetings and Club News

Auckland Rugby League Junior Management Committee
They held their annual meeting in the Auckland Rugby League rooms on Courthouse Lane on Tuesday, March 31 at 8pm. Mr. E. Chapman was elected chairman and the present board was re-elected. The junior control board appointed the following officers:- Chairman, Mr. E. Chapman, deputy chairman, Mr. C. Howe, secretary, Mr. W. F. Clarke, Mr. Chapman was appointed as delegate to the senior board. The junior control board resolved at its weekly meeting prior to the start of the season to increase the weights in all junior grades by 5lb at weighing in with no restriction on normal growth of players during the season. This was considered a war time measure designed to meet clubs wishes. The age restrictions in all grades would remain unaltered.

Auckland Rugby League Primary School Management Committee
Nominations were received for 36 schoolboy teams and four seven-a-side teams. Forty eight footballs were presented to the schoolboy committee.

Auckland Rugby League Referees Association
The Auckland referees elected Mr. A. C. Gallagher as their representative on the Referees Appointment Board. At the April 15 board meeting the Referees’ Association advised that Mr. M. Renton had been elected as deputy to Mr. Percy Rogers on the Referees’ Appointments Board. Mr. T. Carey was appointed the junior representative on the referee’s appointment committee.

Avondale Rugby League Football Club
On February 7, Avondale junior player, Richard Mark Geard was killed accidentally by a bomb explosion at Trentham Military Camp after he had been a member of the territorials for four months. He was at the Army School of Instruction at Trentham and on a special course after being called to service by ballot. His death occurred during a demonstration being given to a class of officers and non-commissioned officers undergoing instruction in the practical use of bombs. A bomb which had had its fuse lit was about to be thrown when it detonated. Four men were killed instantly including Geard, 4 were seriously injured with one dying later, and eight others injured. He was buried at Waikumete Cemetery in Glen Eden, Auckland. He was aged just 19 at the time of his death. The club held their annual meeting on Wednesday, April 15 in the Labour Party Rooms on St George’s Road at 8pm. Their secretary was H. W. Green.

City Rovers Football Club
It was reported on January 21, 1942 that Private William Vuglar who was initially reported missing had in fact been captured and was a prisoner of war. He was a member of the City rugby league club. Vuglar had been captured on December 13, 1941 and was held at the Prisoner of War – Stalag VIII-B (later 344) camp in Lamsdorf, Poland. In March it was reported that Private Andrew Albert James Mitchell had been killed in the Middle East. He was 24 years of age and had played for the City Rovers club for about six years prior to his departure for war. His death occurred on December 5, 1941, in the sinking of the SS Chakdina. The ship was carrying 380 wounded, including 97 New Zealanders from Tobruk Harbour. At 9 pm an enemy plane dropped a torpedo into one of its after holds and the ship sank in  minutes. Around 400 on board were killed, including some German and Italian POWs. City Rovers held their annual meeting at the Auckland Rugby League rooms at Courthouse Lane on Tuesday, the 24th of March at 7.30pm. Their secretary Ernie Asher advertised the meeting. City held a practice for all grades at 3pm at Carlaw Park on April 11 and advertised that future trainings would be on Tuesday and Thursday evenings.

Ellerslie United Football Club
It was reported on January 12 that Ernest John Warner had been killed in the Western Desert campaign in North Africa on December 1, 1941. He was a member of the Ellerslie club and was part of the fifth grade side which won the 1939 knock-out competition. He died the day before his 22nd birthday. Ellerslie held their annual meeting on Thursday, March 19 at 8pm at the Parish Hall in Ellerslie. At their annual meeting it was noted that they had 21 members on active service. Tribute was paid to the memory of Private Gordon Bert Osborne and Gunner E. J. Osborne, who had been killed in action. Gordon had been killed on December 1, 1941 in the Western Desert campaign, North Africa. He was buried at Knightsbridge War Cemetery, Acroma, Libya. Their annual report reviewed the performances of their six grade sides with special reference being made to their senior B side and their seventh grade side. The later team won the championship and knockout and were presented with caps by Mr. T. Kane who represented the junior control board. Mr. George Chapman, a life member was also in attendance. Their honorary secretary was Mr. G. Whaley. They held a training for all grades at the Ellerslie Reserve on Saturday, April 11 at 2pm.

It was reported on November 2 that Arthur Gibson Osborne had received a commission in the R.N.Z.A.F. and been posted to the Middle East. He was an Ellerslie league player. His only brother Private Gordon Osborne, who had also played for Ellerslie, was killed in December 1941 in the first Libyan battle.

Glenora Rugby League Football Club
Glenora held their annual meeting on Monday, March 30 at the Toc H Hall. G Malam was acting secretary.

Green Lane Football Club
Green Lane held their annual meeting at their headquarters in Green Lane on Wednesday, March 25 at 7.30pm.

Manukau Rugby League Football Club
On January 12, Harold Lancelot Hughes died aged 53. He was originally a rugby player for Parnell in his younger years before becoming involved with the Manukau rugby league club where he became a selector, and then later a referee. He was working at the Railway Department in Onehunga, where he lived at the time of his death. Manukau advertised their annual meeting for Monday, March 16 at 7.45pm at the Training Shed on Galway Street in Onehunga. On May 19 Manukau called a meeting at their Training Shed on Galway Street to elect a secretary-treasurer.

Marist Brothers League Football Club
On Thursday the 19th of March, Marist held their annual meeting at the Auckland Rugby League clubrooms on Courthouse Lane. The notice was advertised by their honorary secretary Jack Kirwan. Marist held a practice at Carlaw Park on Saturday, April 11 at 2pm.

Mount Albert League Football Club
Mount Albert announced their annual meeting for March 23 at the King George Hall in Mt Albert at 7.30pm. Mt Albert's former captain, Martin Hansen was welcomed back from war in the Middle East at the board of control meeting on April 1. On May 21 Mount Albert held a special meeting of members and players at the Pavilion Fowlds Park, Morningside for the purpose of forming a committee to carry on the activities of the club. Mr. B. Brigham was the president of the club. On the 21st of July it was reported that Gunner Reginald George Roberts had died from wounds in the war. He had been educated at Newton East School and was a member of the Mount Albert rugby league club. He was a gunner in the 14 Light Anti-Aircraft Regiment and was killed on July 5, 1942 at the age of 25 in the Western Desert campaign, North Africa. Roberts was buried at El Alamein War Cemetery, Egypt. On August 22 the Mount Albert club advertised in the newspaper: “will relatives or friends of members of the Mt. Albert Rugby League Club who are prisoners of war kindly send addresses to the Sec., Mr. F. W. Clement, 168 Blockhouse Bay Rd., Avondale”.

It was reported in September that former Mount Albert player Jack Leslie Jury, who had previously been reported missing in action was now presumed dead. He had gone missing while on air operation on August 12, 1942. Jury's rank had been a Sergeant Gunner, and was educated at Seddon Memorial Technical College. He was aged 20 at the time of his death and was memorialised at Jonkerbos War Cemetery, Gelderland, Netherlands.

Newton Rangers League Football Club
On January 5 it was reported that Newton member, Major William Andrew Knox was "wounded and missing". It was later found that he had died on December 5, 1941. He was serving with the New Zealand Artillery, 7 Anti Tank Regiment at the time of his death. He had also served in World War I and was aged 48. His death occurred due to the sinking of the SS Chakdina. The ship was carrying 380 wounded, including 97 New Zealanders such as Knox from Tobruk Harbour. At 9pm an enemy plane dropped a torpedo into one of its after holds and the ship sank in 3 and a half minutes. Around 400 on board were killed, including some German and Italian POW’s. The sinking also claimed the life of Andrew Mitchell of the City Rovers club. Knox had served in the Field Artillery in World War 1. In 1941 Knox was transferred into the New Zealand Ordnance Corps as the officer commanding of the NZ Divisional Ordnance Field Park and was granted the rank of temporary major. He was injured after driving over a land mine and admitted to a casualty clearing station on 29 November, 1941. Only 18 of the New Zealanders on board survived with all those remaining presumed drowned. The Newton Rangers 32nd annual meeting was scheduled for Monday, March 16 at 7.45pm at the Auckland Rugby League rooms in Grey’s Building, Courthouse Lane.

North Shore Albions League Football Club
It was reported on January 3 that a former North Shore junior player, Private Ernest Henry Leaity of the 21st Auckland Battalion had been killed in action. He had been killed on December 1, 1941 in the Western Desert campaign in North Africa. He was buried at Knightsbridge War Cemetery in Acroma, Libya. He grew up in Devonport and was memorialised on Lake Road in that suburb.

North Shore Albions held their annual meeting at Buffalo Hall, Devonport on March 5 at 8pm. North Shore advertised their first practice for all grades in mid April, and their senior coach was once again Allan Seagar with M. W. Coghlan as the honorary secretary. North Shore called for a special meeting of players and committee at their Football Shed in Devonport at 7.30pm on Monday the 15th of June to discuss the amalgamation with Marist Old Boys.

Northcote and Birkenhead Ramblers Football Club

Otahuhu Rugby League Football Club
Otahuhu held their annual meeting at their training shed on Fairburn Rd in Otahuhu on Tuesday, March 18 at 7.45pm. M. Ritchie was their honorary secretary for the season.

Papakura Rugby League Football Club
In late January it was reported that Papakura senior B player Lance-Corporal Robert Leslie Gibson, who had been reported killed in action on November 26 was in fact a prisoner of war. He had been captured on December 13 with the 24th Battalion, and was held prisoner at the Prisoner Of War camp in Salonike, Greece, and then Stalag VIII-B in Łambinowice, Germany, and later P.G. 103, Treviso, Italy. He was an employee of the Ōtāhuhu workshops. The Papakura club advertised that their annual general meeting would be held in the Scout Hall, Papakura on Monday, the 9th of March. At their annual meeting in April it was reported that the club was in a strong financial position. Due to the “war conditions the club decided to concentrate its efforts on running the lower grades and schoolboys’ teams”. Their report stated that 80 members were in the armed forces. The following officers were elected:- Patron, Mr. H. A. Pollock; president, Mr. L. McVeigh; vice presidents, last years re-elected; treasurer, Mr. N. G. Topp; executive, Messrs. W. Leighton, A. Hill, A. Gyde, A. Scharbeger, W. Lacassie, R. Bates, A. Burgess, E. Clarke, F. Osborne; secretary to be elected by committee. The club also decided to place its social rooms at the disposal of the Emergency Precaution Service in case of emergency. In May the Papakura club applied for the use of Prince Edward Park with the secretary stating in a letter to the Papakura Borough Council that the club intended on confining its activities to schoolboy football only. The council therefore reduced their ground fees from £10 to £5. On June 15 it was reported that the Papakura club had asked to “cancel the application for the use of the playing area on Prince Edward Park. We have been granted permission to play on the local school ground”, so stated Mr. A. L. Lewis, the honorary secretary of the club in a letter to the Papakura Borough Council. It went on to say that “owing to transport difficulties all schoolboy teams have to travel by train and the school ground is more convenient”. He thanked the council for “past consideration, and added that the club hoped to have the privilege of playing on the park again when conditions became normal”. The council agreed to the cancellation.

On July 15 it was reported that Private E. (Ted) H. L. Williams had been killed in action. He was 22 years of age. He had been educated at Kowhai School in Mount Albert, and Te Hoe School in Ōtorohanga. He had played rugby for the North Shore club in Auckland and also for the Papakura rugby league club. He was part of the 24 Infantry Battalion and was killed in action on June 28 in the Western Desert, North Africa. Williams was buried at El Alamein War Cemetery, Egypt. On the evening of July 31 a recreation hut was opened in Papakura with the Mayor of Auckland, Mr. J. A. C. Allum in attendance and the Mayor of Papakura, Mr. S. Evans presiding. The hut had been fitted with a billiards table, writing tables and various games. A piano was lent for the duration of the war by the Papakura Rugby League Club.

Point Chevalier Rugby League Football Club
On April 7 they held their annual meeting at the Social Club Hall on Point Chevalier Road at 6pm. They announced practice for all grades on April 18 at 2pm at Walker Park. Their honorary secretary was A. G. Daniels. On June 2 it was reported that Stanley (Stan) George of Grey Lynn had gained his commission as pilot officer in the R.A.F.. He had been educated at Grey Lynn School and Seddon Memorial Technical College. He played rugby league for the Point Chevalier club and left for the war aged 23 in 1941. In a match at Walker Park in Point Chevalier on June 20 a 17-year-old player, Noel Mitchell was admitted to Auckland Hospital after suffering a concussion injury during a match. His condition was not listed as serious that evening.

Ponsonby United Football Club
In March it was reported that Pilot-Officer Dallas Harley Yeoman was missing as a result of air operations in the Middle East. He had been educated at Ponsonby School and the Seddon Memorial Technical College. He played for the Ponsonby senior reserves in 1936 and 1937 before moving to Wellington. He was not killed however and at the completion of the war he enlisted in the Jayforce and served there until 1948. On June 16 Ponsonby notified the board that its junior schoolboys and seven-a-side teams were being coached by a woman and suggested that this was "perhaps unique in the world of sport".

Richmond Rovers Football Club
In February it was reported that former senior player Keith Walker Fletcher had been promoted to the rank of sub-lieutenant in the Navy. He played for the senior side from 1936 to 1939 after moving to Auckland from Palmerston North. He was the brother of Eric Fletcher who also played for Richmond, and New Zealand. The Richmond club advertised their annual meeting to be held at their club rooms in Grey Lynn Park on Tuesday, March 10 at 7.45pm. It was reported in June that Sergeant-Pilot Donald (Doug) Fraser lost his life in an aircraft accident. He was 22 years of age and had been a Richmond junior. He had joined the Royal New Zealand Air Force in July 1941 and went overseas in January. He was killed on June 12. Fraser was buried at Carlisle Cemetery, Cumberland, England.

On October 23 it was reported that Sergeant Pilot Andrew Kronfeld, aged 24 was promoted to the rank of pilot officer. At the time he was serving with a fighter unit in India. He had been educated at Mount Albert Grammar School and later played rugby for Ponsonby before joining the Richmond club where he played for their senior side prior to his enlistment.

Transfers and registrations
At the 3rd of June at the board meeting an application was received from the Wellington League to transfer Harold Milliken, the ex-All Black and New Zealand league representative from the Papakura club to Petone. The transfer was granted pending New Zealand Rugby League's permission.

References

External links
 Auckland Rugby League Official Site

Auckland Rugby League seasons
Rugby league in Auckland
Rugby league governing bodies in New Zealand
Rugby league